Rootwater was a Polish nu metal band, formed in Warsaw in 2002 by Sebastian Zusin, Tomasz "Yońca" Jońca and Paweł Jurkowski. Soon, Maciej Taff has joined the band as a vocalist. In their music there are many hardcore, thrash, folk and punk, and even ambient influences clearly audible. The name of the band comes from a Magic: The Gathering card captioned "Rootwater Commando". The band is famous for their psychedelic album covers. Many critics are comparing Rootwater's music to System of a Down's music, which is probably caused by a similar use of native "folkish" melodies by both groups. Rootwater's vocalist, Maciej Taff usually sings in English, but some songs refer to Hebrew (Hava Nagila), or are sung in traditional Roma language (Caje Sukarije), Polish, or French (Climchoque).

Members
 Last line-up
 Maciej Taff - vocalist (2002–2010)
 Sebastian Zusin - guitar (2002–2010)
 Filip "Heinrich" Hałucha - bass guitar (2004–2010) 
 Marcin "Valeo" Walenczykowski - guitar (2009–2010; died 2018) 
 Grzegorz "Gregor" Olejnik - drums (2009–2010)

 Former members  
 Paweł "Paul" Jaroszewicz - drums (2008) 
 Michał Truong - guitar (2004-2009)
 Artur Rowiński - drums (2004-2008)
 Tomasz "Yońca" Jońca - guitar (2002-2004)
 Paweł Jurkowski - drums (2002-2004)
 Przemysław Bieliński - bass guitar (2002-2004)

Discography

Studio albums

Music videos

References

External links
 Official website

Alternative metal musical groups
Polish musical groups
Musical groups established in 2002
Polish heavy metal musical groups
2002 establishments in Poland
Mystic Production artists 
Musical quintets